Matelea porphyrocephala is a species of plant in the family Apocynaceae. It is endemic to Ecuador.  Its natural habitat is subtropical or tropical moist montane forests. It is threatened by habitat loss.

References

Flora of Ecuador
porphyrocephala
Vulnerable plants
Taxonomy articles created by Polbot